The Pattullo Bridge is a through arch bridge that crosses the Fraser River and links the city of New Westminster to the city of Surrey in British Columbia. It was named in honour of Thomas Dufferin Pattullo, the 22nd Premier of British Columbia. A key link between Surrey and the rest of Greater Vancouver, the Pattullo Bridge handles an average of 75,700 cars and 3840 trucks daily, or roughly 20% of vehicle traffic across the Fraser River as of 2013.

About
The bridge has no barrier of any sort in the centre, making it highly prone to head-on collisions, especially at excessive speed or in bad weather. The narrow traffic lanes and lack of centre divider have led to lane closures from 10:00 p.m. to 5:00 a.m. for safety. TransLink has also installed a series of plastic pillars to raise the visibility of the centre-lane divider.

In response to the high number of crashes on the bridge, TransLink studied the idea of reducing the number of lanes on the bridge from four to three using a counterflow operation, similar to that used on the Lions' Gate Bridge, with the number of lanes varied depending on traffic flow and volume. However, traffic analysis showed that significant congestion would result in Surrey and New Westminster, and the idea was abandoned. TransLink also examined a number of options to install a centre-line barrier and, in concert, to ban truck traffic from the bridge because the barrier would further narrow the traffic lanes, but that too was proven impractical. A more controversial proposal is to install photo radar on the bridge to enforce the existing speed limit. Thus far, the provincial government has ruled out the idea of bringing back photo radar, which it eliminated province-wide in 2001.

Oversized commercial vehicles are prohibited from using the bridge, as mandated by the British Columbia Commercial Vehicle Safety and Enforcement agency.

History
The first regular crossing of the Fraser River started in 1882, and was operated by a steam ferry named K de K, which transported residents and livestock from Brownsville to New Westminster. During the late 1890s, the need for a new bridge became apparent after the existing ferry was deemed insufficient to handle future traffic demands. The first bridge, a combined steel two deck road and rail span, started construction in 1902, with completion in 1904. The bridge was built with two decks, the upper deck handling vehicular traffic and the lower deck functioning as a railway bridge.

Again, growing traffic demands prompted the construction of a second bridge in 1936. The bridge was designed by supervising engineer Major W.G. Swan, and construction was tendered to the Dominion Bridge Company and Northern Construction & J.W. Stewart Ltd. The Pattullo Bridge was opened to traffic on November 15, 1937, by Premier "Duff" Pattullo, with a total cost of $4 million. The bridge was originally tolled at 25¢ per crossing, but was then removed in 1952. The old bridge, now known as the New Westminster Rail Bridge was converted to rail use only, and highway traffic was moved to the Pattullo Bridge.

2009 bridge fire
Around 3 a.m. on January 18, 2009, a fire started on the south end of the bridge in the structure under the bridge deck. The -long wooden trestle on the south side of the bridge connecting the steel and concrete structure to the earthen berm sustained damage, and had to be completely rebuilt. Initially, it was estimated that the bridge would be closed for 4–6 weeks. However, by reusing a temporary bridge structure used on the Canada Line project, the bridge was reopened on Monday, January 26.

Rehabilitation and replacement efforts
On July 31, 2008, TransLink opted to replace the bridge, rather than try to refurbish the aging structure. In June 2014, the Metro Vancouver Mayors' Council determined that the existing structure will be demolished and replaced with a new, 4-lane, tolled replacement bridge. Construction was expected to take place between 2019 and 2023, with the $1.3 billion funding finalized in 2018.

During 2016, rehabilitation work was completed on the bridge deck to keep the bridge operational until the replacement is built. From May 2 to August 26, the bridge was reduced to one lane of traffic in each direction, with full bridge closures on selected days. The bridge reopened one month ahead of schedule, on August 29.

On January 3, 2020, the government of British Columbia contracted Fraser Crossing Partners–a joint partnership between Acciona Infrastructure Canada and Aecon Group–to design and construct the replacement bridge. The contract also includes the construction of new road connections at the bridgeheads in New Westminster and Surrey. The new bridge will include pedestrian access and allow for future widening from 4 lanes to 6 lanes. 

In February 2021, contractors began installing piles that will form the foundation of the bridge tower. However, this work was temporarily suspended to protect fish and habitat. On April 1, 2021, construction began on the replacement bridge with an expected opening date in 2024.

See also
 List of crossings of the Fraser River
 List of bridges in Canada

References

External links

Buildings and structures in New Westminster
Buildings and structures in Surrey, British Columbia
Bridges completed in 1937
Bridges in Greater Vancouver
Bridges over the Fraser River
Road bridges in British Columbia
Through arch bridges in Canada
TransLink (British Columbia)
Truss bridges in Canada